Ali Imam (31 December 1950 – 21 November 2022) was a Bangladeshi children's writer and audio-visual organizer. He wrote many scientific stories, travel stories for children. He was awarded Bangla Academy Literary Award in 2001 in juvenile literature.

Early life
Imam was born in Brahmanbaria on 31 December 1950. Six months after his birth, his whole family shifted to Dhaka. He spent his childhood in Nawabpur, Lincoln road, Thataribazar of Old Dhaka.

Work
Imam wrote more than 630 books and translated nearly 40. Child psychology, humanism and adventure are found in his writing.

Imam was the general manager of Bangladesh Television and retired from the job in 2006.

Personal life and death
Imam died on 21 November 2022, at the age of 71.

References

External links

1950 births
2022 deaths
People from Dhaka
Bangladeshi male writers
Bengali-language writers
Bengali-language science fiction writers
Bangladeshi educators
Recipients of Bangla Academy Award